Karen Khachatrian also known with his literary name Khachkar (in Armenian Խաչկար) is an Armenian writer, scientist, and Armenian public figure.

Khachatrian was born on November 10, 1962, in Yerevan. In 1984, he graduated from Yerevan Polytechnic Institute with a diploma of mining engineer-constructor. worked in the mines of Megradzor  as a shift and site supervisor. As an engineer-researcher, worked at the Georgian Research Institute of Hydraulic Structures.

In 1988 he proceeded the post-graduate studies at the Moscow Mining Institute (Moscow State Mining University), defended his dissertation and obtained Ph.D  degree. From that year on, K. Khachatrian is teaching at the National Polytechnic University of Armenia in its "Mining Engineering Department". In 1991 he was awarded the rank of associate professor.

Khachatrian emigrated to the US in 1992. Until 2005 he worked in  establishment "PHOTORUN", where he was the  general manager and supervisor of the company. From 2006 to the present day, he is a civil servant and is working at the Los Angeles County Department of Public Works as a specialist in geographic information systems (GIS)

Khachatrian continued his studies in different educational institutions of the US: at California State University of Fresno (Cal State Fresno), Cal State University of Northridge (CSUN), California State Polytechnic University of Pomona (CalPoly Pomona).
 
In 2003, he obtained a PhD in Mining Engineering and in 2009, a master's degree in Civil Engineering, (MSCE), and in 2016 a Master in Public Administration (MPA).
 
In 2015 Khachatrian was elected a Member of the Russian Academy of Natural Scienceʂ, He was elected a vice president and scientific secretary of the USA Scientific Center of the Russian Academy of Natural Sciences (RANS). He was the founding chief editor of RANS  Periodical Znatok, until end of 2018.

Since 2015 he was a founding member, vice-president and scientific secretary of the former National Academy of Sciences of Western Armenia (currently Armenian National American Academy of Sciences after Woodrow Wilson /ANAAS/), founding chief editor of its magazine Gitak (2015-2019). 

He was the designer of all the awards, and symbols of the mentioned two organizations: (“Vladimir Vernadsky” medal, “Peter the Great” order, of RANS, and “Woodrow Wilson” gold medal of ANAAS, also award papers, seals and stamps). From the end of the 2018, Karen Khachatrian stepped down from the administrative positions of the mentioned two organizations. 

Khachatrian (literary name Khachkar) is a member of the Writers' Association of Armenia, member of the Journalists' Association of Armenia, member of the International Federation of Journalists, 
Executive Vice-Chairman of the Armenian Writers Association of the United States of America. He has written over hundred poems, mystery novels and short stories, historical novels and dozens of essays and articles, theatrical plays.  Karen Khachatrian was awardedː
The Gold Medal of “Vladimir Vernadsky”, the Russian Academy of Natural Sciences, 
The Gold Medal of the “Woodrow Wilson” National Academy of Sciences of Western Armenia,
The Gold Medal " Vernatoun" of the Armenian Writers Association of the USA (:hy:Ամերիկայի Միացյալ Նահանգների հայ գրողների և լրագրողների միություն),
The Order of "The Knight in Science and Culture", the Russian Academy of Natural Sciences,
The Order of "Peter the Great", the USA branch of the Russian Academy of Natural Sciences,
The Medal of "Ivan Bunin", the Russian Academy of Natural Sciences,
The Order “Star of Honor”, the Russian Academy of Natural Sciences,
The Gold Medal of the Ministry of Culture of Armenia, 
The Medal “Mayrenii Despan” of the Ministry of Diaspora of Armenia.

References

Российская государственная библиотека - Электронный каталог
Российская государственная библиотека - Электронный каталог

1962 births
Living people
Armenian scientists